The 2017 NPF College Draft is 14th annual collegiate draft for NPF. It took place April 24, 2017 7:00 CT in Nashville, Tennessee at Acme Feed & Seed, a downtown entertainment venue. It was available for internet viewing via NPFTV, the league's streaming platform. The first selection was Jessica Burroughs of Florida State, picked by the USSSA Pride

The Draft
With the dissolution of the Pennsylvania Rebellion, the draft was condensed to five rounds and any picks due to trades with the Rebellion were disregarded.

Drafting an athlete gives an NPF affiliate team the rights to that athlete for two full seasons.

Draft Selections
Position key:

C = catcher; INF = infielder; SS = shortstop; OF = outfielder; UT = Utility infielder; P = pitcher; RHP = right-handed pitcher; LHP = left-handed pitcherPositions will be listed as combined for those who can play multiple positions.

Round 1

Round 2

Round 3

Round 4

Round 5

Draft notes
Round 1:

Round 2:

Round 3:

Round 4:

Round 5:

Round 6:

References

2017 in softball
National Pro Fastpitch drafts
Softball in the United States
Softball teams